Bellastraea aurea, common name the golden small star, is a species of sea snail, a marine gastropod mollusk in the family Turbinidae, the turban snails.

Description
The height of the shell varies between 10 mm and 14 mm, its diameter between 12 mm and 19 mm. The small, solid, imperforate shell has a depressed-conic shape. Its color pattern is golden yellow or olive. The spire is low-conic and contains five whorls. These are scarcely convex above, and plicate at the sutures. The folds become fainter and frequently, bifurcating toward the periphery. The whorls are spirally lirate, the lirae below rather coarse, beaded, above finer, cutting the folds more or less into granules. The body whorl generally descends toward the aperture, and is compressed toward the periphery, which is subangular except in large specimens. The oblique aperture is rather small and is pearly white. The columellar callus is dilated over the umbilical region, and excavated there, and with an indistinct denticle near its base.

Distribution
This marine species is endemic to Australia and occurs in the shallow subtidal zone off South Australia, Tasmania, Victoria and Western Australia.

References

 Jonas, J.H. 1845. Neue conchylien. Malakozoologische Blätter 1845: 169–173
 Swainson, W. 1855. On the characters of Astele, a new division in the family of Trochinae or Trochiform shells; together with the description of another species of the same family. Proceedings of the Royal Society of Tasmania 3: 36–41, pl. 6
 Tenison-Woods, J.E. 1876. Description of new Tasmanian shells. Papers and Proceedings of the Royal Society of Tasmania 1875: 134–162
 Tenison-Woods, J.E. 1877. On some new Tasmanian marine shells. Papers and Proceedings of the Royal Society of Tasmania 1876: 131–159
 Pritchard, G.B. & Gatliff, J.H. 1902. Catalogue of the marine shells of Victoria. Part V. Proceedings of the Royal Society of Victoria 14(2): 85–138 
 May, W.L. 1921. A Checklist of the Mollusca of Tasmania. Hobart, Tasmania : Government Printer 114 pp.
 Cotton, B.C. 1959. South Australian Mollusca. Archaeogastropoda. Handbook of the Flora and Fauna of South Australia. Adelaide : South Australian Government Printer 449 pp.
 Habe, T. 1959. Radulae of four gastropods from South Australia and New Zealand. Journal of the Malacological Society of Australia 3: 37–38
 Iredale, T. & McMichael, D.F. 1962. A reference list of the marine Mollusca of New South Wales. Memoirs of the Australian Museum 11: 1–109
 Macpherson, J.H. 1966. Port Philip Survey 1957–1963. Memoirs of the National Museum of Victoria, Melbourne 27: 201–288
 Wilson, B. 1993. Australian Marine Shells. Prosobranch Gastropods. Kallaroo, Western Australia : Odyssey Publishing Vol. 1 408 pp. 
 Williams, S.T. (2007). Origins and diversification of Indo-West Pacific marine fauna: evolutionary history and biogeography of turban shells (Gastropoda, Turbinidae). Biological Journal of the Linnean Society, 2007, 92, 573–592.

External links

aurea
Gastropods described in 1844